The Pepino Formation is a geologic formation in Puerto Rico. It preserves fossils dating back to the Paleogene period. It is located 4 miles west of the municipality of Lares.

See also 

 List of fossiliferous stratigraphic units in Puerto Rico

References

External links 
 

Geologic formations of Puerto Rico
Paleogene Puerto Rico